The British Rail Class 10 diesel locomotives are a variant of the standard Class 08 diesel-electric shunter with a Lister Blackstone diesel engine and General Electric Company plc (GEC) traction motors. The locomotives were built at the BR Works in Darlington and Doncaster over the period 1955–1962, and were withdrawn between February 1967 and June 1972.

Background
British Railways built four main variants of its standard large diesel-electric shunter. Those fitted with a Lister Blackstone diesel engine were classified D3/4 if they had GEC traction motors and D3/5 with British Thomson-Houston (BTH) traction motors. The D3/4 locomotives were later reclassified to become Class 10 under TOPS.

Technical details
The locomotives had the same  general outline, 0-6-0 wheel arrangement and outside frames as the earlier Class 11, built originally for the London, Midland and Scottish Railway after 1945, and perpetuated by British Railways as the Class 08. However, they were fitted with Lister Blackstone 6-cylinder, 4-stroke, ER6T engines and two GEC nose suspended motors.

Building and use
The first batch of thirty locomotives, originally numbered 13137-13151, (later renumbered D3137-D3151) were built at Darlington works during 1955, and allocated to motive power depots in the North Eastern Region of British Railways, notably Thornaby.  Further batches were built at Darlington as follows: D3439-D3453 (1957); D3473-D3491 (1957/8); D3612-D3651 (1958); D4049-D4094 (1961/2). These were allocated to the Eastern Region of British Railways particularly in the London area. Six examples, D3497-D3502, were built at Doncaster (1957/8). The class eventually numbered 146 locomotives.

Withdrawal
As they were non-standard, compared to the 08 class they had relatively short lives and were withdrawn between February 1967 and June 1972. Twenty locomotives were sold to industrial customers.

Post BR Use

Preservation

Four examples have been preserved:
 D3452 at Bodmin and Wenford Railway
 D3489 at Spa Valley Railway
 D4067 at Great Central Railway
 D4092 at Barrow Hill Engine Shed
 A fifth example, D3476, was stored on the Colne Valley Railway, though has since been scrapped.

References

 

10
C locomotives
Standard gauge locomotives of Great Britain
Diesel-electric locomotives of Great Britain
Railway locomotives introduced in 1955